Morberg is a Swedish surname. Notable people with the surname include:

Alida Morberg (born 1985), Swedish actress
Bengt Morberg (1897–1968), Swedish Olympic gymnast
Per Morberg (born Andersson in 1960), Swedish actor, chef, and news presenter

Swedish-language surnames